Michael McIlorum (born 10 January 1988) is a professional rugby league footballer who plays as a  for the Catalans Dragons in the Betfred Super League. He is both an Ireland and England international.

He had played his entire professional career with the Wigan Warriors in the Super League, prior to his move to the South of France. He won the 2010 and 2013 Super League Championships with Wigan.

Background
McIlorum was born 10 January 1988 in Leeds, West Yorkshire, England, and attended Farnley Park High School.

He was a Leeds amateur at Stanningley and Queens. He had been selected for England U16s in 2004 and joined Wigan's under-18s Academy in 2005.

Playing career

Wigan
McIlorum signed a two-year full-time contract with Wigan in July 2005, keeping him at the club until the end of 2007. McIlorum was selected for Yorkshire U17s after joining Wigan in August 2005. He was also included in the England U17s squad to take on the touring Australian Institute of Sport in 2005. He capped the 2005 season by winning the Wigan Supporters' Association Under 18s Player of the Season award.

McIlorum made his senior début for Wigan on 8 June 2007 in a Challenge Cup quarter final tie against Harlequins RL at the JJB Stadium after an injury ruled out first team regular Shane Millard.

In 2010 Wigan made the 2010 Super League Grand Final, and McIlorum was selected to play as a hooker in the victory over St. Helens at Old Trafford.

The following year McIlorum played for Wigan from the substitutes' bench in the 2011 Challenge Cup Final victory over the Leeds Rhinos at Wembley Stadium.

He played in the 2013 Challenge Cup Final victory over Hull F.C. at Wembley Stadium.

Wigan reached the 2013 Super League Grand Final, and McIlorum was selected to play at hooker, scoring a try in their victory against the Warrington club at Old Trafford.

He played in the 2015 Super League Grand Final defeat by the Leeds side at Old Trafford.

In the 2016 World Club Series against Brisbane, McIlorum suffered a serious ankle injury, and did not play again for the rest of the 2016 season.

He played in the 2017 Challenge Cup Final defeat by Hull F.C. at Wembley Stadium.

Catalans Dragons
In January 2018, McIlorum signed a two-year deal with the Catalans Dragons.

He played in the 2018 Challenge Cup Final victory over the Warrington club at Wembley Stadium.

In the 2020 season, he played in the club's elimination final victory over Leeds but was placed on report during the game.  He was later suspended for six matches after pleading guilty to two charges of a dangerous high tackle and other contrary conduct.

On 9 October 2021, he played for Catalans in their 2021 Super League Grand Final defeat against St. Helens.

International career

Ireland
Being from Irish heritage, McIlorum was named in the Ireland squad for the 2008 Rugby League World Cup.

After not being selected to play for England again after the 2013 World Cup, McIlorum changed his international allegiance back to Ireland in 2017 and was named in their 2017 World Cup squad.

England
In 2012 McIlorum changed his international allegiance to England and made his England début in the 2012 Autumn International Series against Wales playing at hooker. The following year he was selected as part of England's squad for their 2013 World Cup campaign.

Nine years after his last Test cap for England, he was named in the team's 24-man squad for the 2021 Rugby League World Cup.

Career stats

Honours
Super League (2): 2010, 2013
Challenge Cup (3): 2011, 2013, 2018

References

External links

Catalans Dragons profile
(archived by web.archive.org) Profile at catalansdragons.com
(archived by web.archive.org) Profile at wiganwarriors.com
Statistics at wigan.rlfans.com
(archived by web.archive.org) Statistics at superleague.co.uk
 ĎŔƑ Profile at rli.ie
SL profile
2017 Statistics at rlwc2017.com
England profile

1988 births
Living people
Catalans Dragons players
England national rugby league team players
English people of Irish descent
English rugby league players
Ireland national rugby league team players
People from Farnley, Leeds
Rugby league hookers
Rugby league players from Leeds
Wigan Warriors players